The Briton Motor Company was a Wolverhampton-based car manufacturer that produced cars from 1909 to 1919 then from 1922 to 1929. The company produced a number of models ranging from 7 to 16 horsepower and played an important role in the Wolverhampton motor industry.

History

Foundation

The Briton Motor Company was formed in 1909 after the Star Engineering Company took over the Star Cycle Company and manufacture of the 'Starling' and 'Stuart' cars was ended. They were replaced by Briton cars produced by the Briton Car Company, managed by Edward Lisle Junior, son of Star's founder. Briton continued to work out of Star's Stewart Street Works using the same workforce as had been there previously. The first model produced was the two-cylinder, 7 hp, 'Little Briton' which sold for 175 guineas, increasing to 10 and 12 hp. These were followed by four-cylinder models ranging from 12 to 16 hp.

In 1912 the Briton Motor Company (1912) Limited was formed and moved to a new site on lower Walsall street, previously occupied by Shrubbery Iron Works, in 1913. The company took part in many trials across 1912–1913, winning gold and silver medals in the trials at Brooklands, Saltburn and Manchester.

The First World War

Car production continued during the war although Briton did contribute to the war effort by making shell cases. The company also became UK agent for the American Scripps-Booth car, but the venture failed. 1914 and 1915 saw the introduction of new two- and four-seater models with a new deluxe chassis.

In 1917 and 18 only small commercial vehicles and ambulances were produced. However, the company found itself in trouble with the government for failing to meet its contractual obligations. The government demanded compensation which resulted in a call for shares of £50,000.

The end of the company

Production resumed in 1919 with the release of 10/12 hp. car, powered by a four-cylinder engine which sold for 420 guineas. They produced 106 of this model, along with 549 of the 14/16 hp cars. The company was able to raise £50,000 through the sale of shares, and in 1920 three new models were designed, including a Chapuis Dornier-engined sports car although none ever went into production.

Briton produced 170 cars during 1920, 163 of the 10/12 hp. model and 7 of the 10 hp. model. However, the car industry was changing as companies such as Austin and Morris adopted mass-production techniques, meaning they were able to produce and sell cars at a cost that Briton could not match, putting the company in deep financial trouble.

In December 1920 the Midland Bank took £50,000 worth of Briton's stock as repayment of debts owed to them, and the company produced only 65 cars in 1921. In December 1921 the bank appointed receivers for the company, and a month later the company entered liquidation, assessed at a value of £30,500. Britons's works were sold to fellow Wolverhampton company AJS in October 1923 for £7,000.

The Briton Motor Company name was carried on by Charles A. Weight, who took over what remained of the company. Weight moved the machine shop and components that had been left behind to a new site at Chillington Fields, also taking on a number of Briton's old workforce. Car production continued on this site until 1929, when production costs became too great, with around 600 cars having been made in total. The Briton Motor Company continued, becoming Tractor Spares Limited in 1940, a company which still exists today.

On Monday 5th December 2022, a fire broke out on the site of the factory in Horseley Fields Wolverhampton. 100 firefighters attended, two helicopters and numerous police as the site is adjacent to the Wolverhampton Station trainline and in close proximity to the train station. There was also a threat of further damage and potential explosions due to the sites proximity to the British Oxygen Company (BOC) which stores pressurised gases in cylinders. The incident was therefore declared a major incident.  The Willenhall Road in Horseley Fields at the rear of the site, which is a major route out of Wolverhampton leading to J10 of the M6 motor, was closed due to damage to the bridge wall under the train track. The cause of the fire is under investigation.

Car models

References

External links
 Black Country History Website
 The Museums, Galleries and Archives of Wolverhampton

Car manufacturers of the United Kingdom
Manufacturing companies based in Wolverhampton